Karl-Heinz Schnellinger (born 31 March 1939) is a German former footballer who played as a defender. An athletic and hard-tackling player, with a strong physique, he was nicknamed the "Volkswagen" for his continuity of performance, both in quantity and in quality, and for his versatility; indeed, although he was usually deployed as a full-back, he was capable of playing anywhere along the back, and could also play as a centre-back, as a sweeper, or even as a defensive midfielder. In his prime he was often considered one of the best and most complete left-backs in the world in his era, rivaled only by Giacinto Facchetti, Nilton Santos and Silvio Marzolini.

Club career 
Schnellinger was born in Düren (then in Rhine Province, Prussia, today North Rhine-Westphalia). He won the German Championship with 1. FC Köln in 1962, and was awarded the (Footballer of the Year (Germany)), performed well in the 1962 FIFA World Cup and was subsequently named in the tournament's 'Dream-Team'. After Schnellinger had left Köln for A.C. Mantova in 1963, his debut in Serie A came in a match against A.C. Milan which ended in a surprising 4–1 victory for Mantova. However, he played there only for one season before he was signed by A.S. Roma in 1964 when they won the Coppa Italia, and finally by A.C. Milan in 1965, being transferred along with Roma teammates Antonio Valentín Angelillo and Angelo Sormani. He played nine seasons with the Rossoneri, obtaining several successes both at the national and European level. He was one of the first successful German footballers abroad.

Schnellinger left Milan in 1974, and retired after a season back in his native Germany with Tennis Borussia Berlin.

International career 
Schnellinger participated in his first 1958 World Cup in Sweden at the age of 19, and went on to become one of the few players to play in four World Cups (1958, 1962, 1966, 1970). He was renowned for his physical power, pace, and his winning mentality. His only international goal came in the last minute to draw 1–1 in the thrilling semi-final of the 1970 World Cup against Italy, which later became known as the "Game of the Century". His goal led to the famous German radio commentary line "Ausgerechnet Schnellinger!"  – roughly: "Of all the players, it's Schnellinger" – which refers to him never having previously scored for the national team, and also to his being one of the two players in the German squad then playing in the Italian Serie A (the other being Helmut Haller). Italy eventually won 4–3 after extra time. In the previous round, late in the match against England, it was Schnellinger's cross that Uwe Seeler scored from with a backwards header that tied the score 2–2, a game West Germany won 3–2 after extra time. Schnellinger won his last cap in 1971.
He is the last surviving player from the Germany team in the 1958 World Cup.

Personal life 
Schnellinger later lived in Milan's suburb of Segrate where he worked as a businessman after retirement from football.

Honours 
1. FC Köln
 German Championship: 1962

Roma
 Coppa Italia: 1963–64

A.C. Milan
 Serie A: 1967–68
 Coppa Italia: 1966–67, 1971–72, 1972–73
 European Cup: 1968–69
 European Cup Winners' Cup: 1967–68, 1972–73
 Intercontinental Cup: 1969

West Germany
 FIFA World Cup: runner-up 1966, third place 1970, fourth place 1958

Individual 
 Ballon d'Or third place: 1962
 Footballer of the Year (Germany): 1962
 FIFA World Cup All-Star Team: 1962
 FIFA XI: 1963, 1967
A.C. Milan Hall of Fame

References 

1939 births
Living people
People from Düren
Sportspeople from Cologne (region)
Footballers from North Rhine-Westphalia
German footballers
Association football defenders
1. FC Köln players
Mantova 1911 players
A.C. Milan players
A.S. Roma players
Tennis Borussia Berlin players
Bundesliga players
Serie A players
UEFA Champions League winning players
Germany international footballers
1958 FIFA World Cup players
1962 FIFA World Cup players
1966 FIFA World Cup players
1970 FIFA World Cup players
West German expatriate footballers
West German expatriate sportspeople in Italy
Expatriate footballers in Italy
West German footballers

nds:Karl-Heinz Schnellinger